Maymena is a genus of spiders in the family Mysmenidae. It was first described in 1960 by Gertsch. , it contains 13 species.

Species
Maymena comprises the following species:
Maymena ambita (Barrows, 1940)
Maymena calcarata (Simon, 1898)
Maymena cascada Gertsch, 1971
Maymena chica Gertsch, 1960
Maymena delicata Gertsch, 1971
Maymena grisea Gertsch, 1971
Maymena kehen Miller, Griswold & Yin, 2009
Maymena mayana (Chamberlin & Ivie, 1938)
Maymena misteca Gertsch, 1960
Maymena paquini Miller, Griswold & Yin, 2009
Maymena rica Platnick, 1993
Maymena roca Baert, 1990
Maymena sbordonii Brignoli, 1974

References

Mysmenidae
Araneomorphae genera
Spiders of North America
Spiders of South America
Spiders of Asia